Turn Me On is the fourth studio album by noise rock band The Honeymoon Killers, released in 1987 by Buy Our Records.

Release and reception 

Kathleen C. Fennessy of allmusic, seeing Turn Me On as an improvement over the band's previous album, gave the album three out of five stars Critics of the Trouser Press lauded the band's music for "demonstrat[ing] abundant junk-cinema wit" and "show[ing] continued development and structural strength."

Track listing

Personnel 
Adapted from the Turn Me On liner notes.

The Honeymoon Killers
 Sally Edroso – drums, vocals
 Cristina Martinez – electric guitar, vocals
 Jerry Teel – electric guitar, vocals, cover art, illustrations
 Lisa Wells – bass guitar, vocals

Production and additional personnel
 Chris Gehringer – mastering
 The Honeymoon Killers – production
 Michael Lavine – photography
 Wharton Tiers – engineering

Release history

References

External links 
 

1987 albums
The Honeymoon Killers (American band) albums
Albums produced by Wharton Tiers